Kam Hing Wai is a walled village located in the Kam Tin area of Yuen Long District, in Hong Kong. Three other walled villages; Kat Hing Wai, Wing Lung Wai, and Tai Hong Wai) are located nearby and were built around the same time.

Administration
Kam Hing Wai is a recognized village under the New Territories Small House Policy.

History
Kam Hing Wai was established by the Tang clan and is probably dated to the Ming dynasty.

Features
Kam Hing Wai was a walled village with a moat surrounding the village; however, the moat was filled and the walls no longer stand. Only 3 to 4 village houses remain in the original traditional architectural style built with grey bricks. Others are replaced by 2 to 3 storey modern buildings. A temple is located at the northeast corner of the village. An Earth God shrine is located at the southeast of the village.

See also
 Walled villages of Hong Kong

References

External links

 Delineation of area of existing village Ko Po Tsuen (Kam Tin) for election of resident representative (2019 to 2022) (covers Ko Po Tsuen and Kam Hing Wai)
 Map and pictures of Kam Hing Wai (see Site B)

Walled villages of Hong Kong
Kam Tin
Villages in Yuen Long District, Hong Kong